Brian Trump is an American thoroughbred horse racing owner. He is the owner of Supreme Racing.

Early career
In 2013, Trump became the racing manager and Director of Operations of Rockingham Ranch, working with owner and father-in-law Gary Hartunian. He managed Eclipse Champion and Breeders' Cup winning horses Roy H and Stormy Liberal, becoming the first manager to manage winning horses in back-to-back Breeders’ Cups and back-to-back Eclipse Champions.

Supreme Racing
In May 2019, Trump founded his own racing stable, Supreme Racing.

References

Living people
Year of birth missing (living people)
American horse racing industry executives